Lincoln County is a county in eastern Central Oklahoma. As of the 2010 census, the population was 34,273. Its county seat is Chandler.

Lincoln County is part of the Oklahoma City, OK Metropolitan Statistical Area.

In 2010, the center of population of Oklahoma was in Lincoln County, near the town of Sparks.

History
The United States purchased the large tract of land known as the Louisiana Purchase from France in 1803. Washington Irving, Charles J. Latrobe, and Count Albert de Pourtalès accompanied Henry L. Ellsworth and others on an expedition in Indian Territory that may have passed through the far northwestern corner of the future Lincoln County.

The Osage hunted on land that includes present-day Lincoln County until they ceded the area in an 1825 treaty to the federal government. The government then assigned the land to the Creek and the Seminoles after they were removed from the southeastern United States. Following Quapaw removal in 1834, several small groups of Quapaw dispersed throughout Indian Territory. There were absentee groups of Quapaw living along the Red River and in Creek, Choctaw and Cherokee territory. There is a "Quapaw Creek" in the southern half of Lincoln County which was a village site for one of these absentee groups of Quapaw.  After the Civil War in 1866, the Creek and Seminoles were forced to give up lands that included present-day Lincoln County in Reconstruction Treaties for siding with the Confederacy.

The federal government then used the area to resettle the Sac and Fox, Potawatomi, Kickapoo and Ioway tribes. Established in 1870, the Sac and Fox agency, established on the eastern edge of the present-day county, was the first settlement in the area.

In 1890, the Jerome Commission negotiated with the tribes of the area such that they agreed to allotment of their reservation lands, except for the Kickapoo. Indian lands were allotted to individual tribal members and the excess were opened to white settlement in the Land Run of 1891. A separate land run was held later that year for the townsite of the predesignated county seat, Chandler. Lincoln County was organized and designated as County A. In 1895, the Kickapoo agreed to allotment and the land was claimed by settlers during the Land Run of 1895.

The voters chose the name Lincoln County for County A in honor of President Abraham Lincoln, selecting it over the names Sac, Fox, and Springer.

Geography

The county is drained by the Deep Fork of the Canadian River. The eastern part of the county lies in the Cross Timbers and the Sandstone Hills, while the western part is in the Red Bed Plains.

Major highways
  Interstate 44
  U.S. Highway 62
  U.S. Highway 177
  U.S. Highway 377
  State Highway 18
  State Highway 66
  State Highway 99
  State Highway 102

Adjacent counties
 Payne County (north)
 Creek County (northeast)
 Okfuskee County (southeast)
 Pottawatomie County (south)
 Oklahoma County (southwest)
 Logan County (northwest)

Demographics

As of the census of 2000, 32,080 people, 12,178 households, and 9,121 families resided in the county. The population density was 34 people per square mile (13/km2). There were 13,712 housing units at an average density of 14 per square mile (6/km2). The county's racial makeup was 86.43% White, 2.46% Black or African American, 6.57% Native American, 0.25% Asian, 0.02% Pacific Islander, 0.45% from other races, and 3.82% from two or more races. 1.51% of the population were Hispanic or Latino of any race.

There were 12,178 households, out of which 34.10% had children under the age of 18 living with them, 61.50% were married couples living together, 9.20% had a female householder with no husband present, and 25.10% were non-families. 22.40% of all households were made up of individuals, and 10.50% had someone living alone who was 65 years of age or older. The average household size was 2.59 and the average family size was 3.03.

In the county, the population was spread out, with 27.40% under the age of 18, 7.80% from 18 to 24, 26.70% from 25 to 44, 24.10% from 45 to 64, and 13.90% who were 65 years of age or older. The median age was 38 years. For every 100 females, there were 97.30 males. For every 100 females age 18 and over, there were 94.50 males.

The county's median household income was $31,187, and the median family income was $36,310. Males had a median income of $28,647 versus $20,099 for females. The county's per capita income was $14,890. About 11.10% of families and 14.50% of the population were below the poverty line, including 17.90% of those under age 18 and 12.10% of those age 65 or over.

Government and politics

United States Congress

Oklahoma Senate

Oklahoma House of Representatives

Economy
The county economy has largely depended on agriculture. Cotton almost immediately became the dominant crop after white settlement. During the first decade of the twentieth century, Lincoln County was one of the top two counties producing cotton in Oklahoma. By the end of the Great Depression the economy had become more diversified. Oil furnished one-third of county tax revenue, and cattle raising and pecan growing became important income sources. By the turn of the 21st Century, the county economy had diversified and was based primarily on professional services, small businesses, and service industries.

Communities

Cities
 Chandler (County seat)
 Prague
 Stroud

Towns

 Agra
 Avery
 Carney
 Davenport
 Fallis
 Kendrick
 Meeker
 Sparks
 Tryon
 Warwick
 Wellston

Unincorporated communities
 Arlington
 Jacktown
 Midlothian
 Parkland
 Rossville

Notable people
 Roy Harris (1898 - 1979), composer, born near Chandler;
 Carl Hubbell (1903 - 1988), U.S. major league baseball pitcher lived in Meeker;
 James Brooks Ayers Robertson (1871 - 1938), Oklahoma governor 1919–1923, lived and buried in Chandler;
 Jim Thorpe (1888 - 1953), American athlete, attended Sac and Fox agency school in Lincoln County.
 Roy J. Turner (1894 - 1973), Oklahoma governor 1947–1953, born in Kendrick.

NRHP sites

The following sites in Lincoln County are listed on the National Register of Historic Places:

References

 
Oklahoma City metropolitan area
1891 establishments in Oklahoma Territory
Populated places established in 1891